Jordin Elizabeth Canada (born August 11, 1995) is an American professional basketball player with the Los Angeles Sparks of the Women's National Basketball Association (WNBA). She was selected by the Seattle Storm with the 5th overall pick in the 2018 WNBA draft. Born and raised in Los Angeles, Canada played collegiately with the UCLA Bruins. She is known for her playmaking, speed and crossover skills. In her rookie season with the Storm, she won her first WNBA championship as they swept the Washington Mystics. In 2020, after winning her second WNBA championship, she signed an endorsement deal with Air Jordan.

Early life and high school 
Canada was born in Los Angeles, California, and attended Windward School, where she played for Vanessa Nygaard, a former WNBA player and coach in the USA Basketball program. She earned first-team All League, League MVP, and first-team All-CIF honors in all four years of high school, brought home the Los Angeles Times All-Area MVP in 2013, and played in the McDonald's All-American Game as a senior in 2014.

 College 
Canada started as soon as she got to Westwood, notching a 15-point, 10-rebound double-double in her first career game. She went on to start 30 games in the 2014–15 season, reaching double figures 25 times leading the Bruins in assists per game. The Bruins missed the NCAA Tournament but earned a bid to the 2015 WNIT; UCLA won the tournament, which Canada scoring a career-high 31 points (half of the Bruins' scoring) in a 62–60 win in the finals against West Virginia. She earned tournament MVP honors, along with being named Pac-12 Freshman of the Year.

She started 34 games as a sophomore, finishing second in the Pac-12 in assists per game (5.7) and steals per game (2.3), and also led UCLA in minutes and scoring. Canada led UCLA in minutes and scoring, and the Bruins went 22–7 in the regular season, made the 2016 NCAA tournament as a No. 3 seed, and advanced to the Sweet Sixteen for the first time since 1999. She was named All-Pac-12 and earned a spot on the Pac-12 All-Defensive team, and was an AP All-American honorable mention.

As a junior, Canada continued to grow in to one of the best point guards in the country. She notched her first career triple-double with 11 points, 12 assists, and 10 rebounds against Southern on Nov. 18, 2016, and nearly did it again two days later, finishing with 19 points, 10 rebounds, and nine assists against Cal Poly. Canada scored in double-digits in all but one game in the season, and finished with two points/rebounds double-doubles and six points/assists double-doubles, including three straight in UCLA's run to the Sweet Sixteen in the 2017 NCAA tournament. She earned All-Pac-12, All-Pac-12 defensive, and AP All-American honorable mention honors, and was named Pac-12 Defensive Player of the Year.

Canada opened her senior season with another triple-double, logging 26 points, 10 assists, and 11 steals against San Jose State. Once again, she led the Bruins in scoring, assists, and minutes, and UCLA made its third straight NCAA Tournament, this time advancing to the Elite Eight, where it lost to eventual champions Mississippi State.

Canada finished her career first in UCLA history in assists (831) second in points (2,153), third in field goals made (768), second in free throws made (518), third in steals (347), and fifth in 20-point games (42). She holds three of the top five seasons for assists in UCLA history.

 Professional career 

WNBA
The Seattle Storm took Canada with the fifth overall pick in the 2018 WNBA draft, making her Sue Bird's back-up at point guard. She played in 33 games in her rookie season, making two starts and averaging 5.7 points and 3.3 assists in 16.5 minutes per game. The Storm were championship contenders as they finished the season 26–8 with the number 1 seed, receiving a double bye to the semi-finals. In the semi-finals, the Storm defeated the Phoenix Mercury in a hard-fought five-game series to advance to the WNBA Finals. In the Finals, the Storm would win the championship after defeating the Washington Mystics in a three-game sweep, Canada had increased her offensive game off the bench during the postseason to contribute to the Storm's success of winning the 2018 WNBA championship.

With Bird needing to undergo season-ending knee surgery just before the 2019 season began, Canada found herself as Seattle's starting point guard in her second year. Starting in 29 games, her scoring jumped up to 9.8 points per game. She logged her first professional double-double on July 12, 2019 against the Dallas Wings, scoring 14 points and adding 12 assists. She finished the season second in the WNBA in assists and first in steals, earning a spot on the WNBA All-Defensive Team. The Storm finished as the number 6 seed with a 18–16 record being shorthanded with Sue Bird and Breanna Stewart sitting out the season due to injury. They would win the first round elimination game 84–74 against the Minnesota Lynx, but would lose the second round elimination to the Los Angeles Sparks by a score of 92–69.

In the 2020 season, Canada would revert to playing back-up point guard with Bird returning after knee surgery. The season was delayed and shortened to 22 games in a bubble at IMG Academy due to the COVID-19 pandemic. Canada started in 11 of 20 games played due to Bird's absence during the season dealing with her knee injury. With a fully loaded roster, the Storm finished 18–4 with the number 2 seed, receiving a double bye to the semi-finals. In the semi-finals, they would eliminate the Minnesota Lynx in a three-game sweep, advancing back to the Finals for the second time in three years. In the Finals, the Storm would sweep the Las Vegas Aces to win the championship, ending off their postseason undefeated and also earning Canada her second championship in her first three seasons.

In February 2022, Canada signed a contract with the Los Angeles Sparks.

Overseas
In 2018, Canada signed with Wisła Can-Pack Kraków of the Polish League for the 2018-19 off-season. In December 2020, Canada signed with Hatay BB of the Turkish league for the 2020-21 off-season.

 International  
Canada has been a part of USA Basketball since 2011, when she was part of the U16 National Team that won gold at the FIBA Americas U16 Championship. She won another gold medal at the 2015 World University Games, and helped the U23 National Team win the first-ever U24 Four Nations Tournament in 2017.

Canada was a part of the USA team that won the 2019 AmeriCup, leading the team with 5.3 assists per game and adding 7.2 points per game. After the AmeriCup, she was named to the USA National Team Pool.

WNBA career statistics

Regular season

|-
|style="text-align:left;background:#afe6ba;"| 2018†
| style="text-align:left;"| Seattle
| 33 || 2 || 16.5 || .357 || .182 || .738 || 1.5 || 3.3 || 0.9 || 0.0 || 1.7 || 5.7
|-
| style="text-align:left;"| 2019
| style="text-align:left;"| Seattle
| 30 || 29 || 28.8 || .388 || .186 || .768 || 2.4 || 5.2 || 2.3 || 0.2 || 2.6 || 9.8|-
|style="text-align:left;background:#afe6ba;"|2020†
| style="text-align:left;"| Seattle
| 20 || 11 || 24.2 || .424 || .091 || .772 || 2.3 || 5.5 || 1.5 || 0.0 || 2.0 || 7.9
|-
| style="text-align:left;"| 2021
| style="text-align:left;"| Seattle
| 29 || 3 || 18.7 || .389 || .214 || .841 || 2.3 || 3.0 || 0.7 || 0.1 || 1.1 || 5.8 
|-
| style="text-align:left;"| 2022
| style="text-align:left;"| Los Angeles
| 32 || 25 || 27.0 || .384 || .140 || .806 || 2.3 || 5.5 || 1.4 || 0.2 || 2.3 || 9.2
|-
| style="text-align:left;"| Career
| style="text-align:left;"| 5 years, 2 teams
| 144 || 70 || 22.9 || .386 || .168 || .786 || 2.1 || 4.4 || 1.3 || 0.1 || 2.0 || 7.7

Postseason

|-
|style="text-align:left;background:#afe6ba;"| 2018†
| style="text-align:left;"| Seattle
| 8 || 0 || 13.6 || .477 || .364 || .600 || 1.1 || 2.3 || 0.4 || 0.0 || 1.5 || 6.1
|-
| style="text-align:left;"| 2019
| style="text-align:left;"| Seattle
| 2 || 2 || 33.0 || .405 || .200  || .714 || 3.5 || 5.5 || 1.0 || 0.0 || 2.0 || 	18.0|-
|style="text-align:left;background:#afe6ba;"|2020†
| style="text-align:left;"| Seattle
| 6 || 0 || 15.5 || .545  || .000 || .667 || 1.8 || 1.3 || 0.5 || 0.0 || 0.3 || 7.0
|-
| style="text-align:left;"| 2021
| style="text-align:left;"| Seattle
| 1 || 0 || 10.0 || .000 || .000 || 1.000' || 0.0 || 2.0 || 1.0 || 0.0 || 3.0 || 6.0
|-
| style="text-align:left;"| Career
| style="text-align:left;"| 4 years, 1 team
| 17 || 2 || 16.4 || .462 || .263 || .741 || 1.6 || 2.3 || 0.5 || 0.0 || 1.2 || 7.8

References

External links
UCLA Bruins bio

1995 births
Living people
All-American college women's basketball players
American expatriate basketball people in Poland
American women's basketball players
Basketball players from Los Angeles
LGBT basketball players
LGBT people from California
Lesbian sportswomen
Los Angeles Sparks players
McDonald's High School All-Americans
Parade High School All-Americans (girls' basketball)
Point guards
Seattle Storm draft picks
Seattle Storm players
UCLA Bruins women's basketball players
Windward School alumni
United States women's national basketball team players